Lynsey Reeve Clarke  maiden name Lynsey Armitage (born 6 December 1983 in Pontefract,  West Yorkshire, England) is an Australian lawn bowler.

Bowls career

World Championship
In 2008 she won a gold in the fours and team event and a bronze medal in the pairs at the 2008 World Outdoor Bowls Championship. The success continued in the 2012 World Outdoor Bowls Championship winning another gold medal in the triples and team events.

In 2020 she was selected for the 2020 World Outdoor Bowls Championship in Australia.

Commonwealth Games
She competed in the 2006 Commonwealth Games Pairs competition with Karen Murphy and won the gold medal.  In 2014 under her married name of Clarke she competed in the Women's triples at the 2014 Commonwealth Games where she won a silver medal.

In 2022, she competed in the women's triples and the Women's fours at the 2022 Commonwealth Games.

Asia Pacific
Clarke has won nine medals at the Asia Pacific Bowls Championships (two of which were in her maiden name of Armitage). The medal haul includes four gold medals, the latest at the 2019 Asia Pacific Bowls Championships in the Gold Coast, Queensland.

National
In 2017 she won the pairs and fours titles at the Australian National Bowls Championships and in 2021, she won her 8th & 9th Australian Open crown, this time in the pairs and fours.

References

1983 births
Living people
Sportspeople from Pontefract
Australian female bowls players
Bowls players at the 2014 Commonwealth Games
Bowls players at the 2022 Commonwealth Games
Commonwealth Games silver medallists for Australia
Commonwealth Games medallists in lawn bowls
Bowls World Champions
Medallists at the 2006 Commonwealth Games
Medallists at the 2014 Commonwealth Games